L'Histoire de Babar, le petit éléphant (The story of Babar, the little elephant), FP 129, is a composition for narrator and piano by Francis Poulenc, based on Histoire de Babar and written from 1940.

Genesis 
During the summer of 1940, Francis Poulenc stayed with cousins in Brive-la-Gaillarde. The children of the house, bored by his piano playing, put the book Histoire de Babar by Jean de Brunhoff on his piano and asked him to "play" the story. Poulenc obliged and freely improvised around the narrative situations that were proposed to him. In the following years, he often recalled this incident. L'Histoire de Babar was born from his memories.

The score is dedicated to the eleven children who inspired it: "For my little cousins Sophie, Sylvie, Benoît, Florence and Delphine Périer; Yvan, Alain, Marie-Christine and Marguerite-Marie Villotte; And my little friends Marthe Bosredon and André Lecœur, in memory of Brive". It was created in a broadcast on 14 June 1946 played by the composer, assisted by the recitation of Pierre Bernac. In 1962, Jean Françaix proposed an orchestral version of the piece, which satisfied Poulenc. The English composer David Matthews also transcribed it for chamber orchestra.

L'histoire de Babar is one of Francis Poulenc's most popular compositions. According to Guy Sacre, "it is in every respect a success, and one of the most accomplished works he has given to his instrument".

Structure 
This narrative composition presents itself as an "uninterrupted succession of pianistic images". The most diverse musical forms succeed each other:
Elephantine berceuse sung by the mother of Babar (pp. 1–2), whom the latter then recalls with tears (pp. 10)
Valse musette of the pastry (pp. 12–13)
Babar's wedding march, celebrated by a whole collection of pompous chords (pp. 26–27)
Dancing polka played on the evening of the same wedding (pp. 27–29)
Final nocturne in the form of a lunar reverie (pp. 30–31)

Selected recordings 
A recording of L'Histoire de Babar, le petit éléphant was made in 2012 by Natalie Dessay, narrator and Shani Diluka piano, at éditions .

Other recordings with piano solo include:

 one with Pierre Fresnay, narrator, and Francis Poulenc piano
 one with Raymond Gérôme, narrator, and Jacques Février piano
 one with Bruno Belthoise, narrator and pianist, éditions Frémeaux et associés 1997

Among the recordings for orchestra are:

 one with Peter Ustinov, narrator, with the Orchestre de la Société des concerts du Conservatoire under the direction of Georges Prêtre (EMI Classics)
 one with Sophie Marceau, narrator, with the orchestre de l'opéra de Lyon under the direction of Kent Nagano in 1994 (ERATO junior)
 one with Àgata Roca, narrator, with the Ensemble Orquestra de Cadaqués under the direction of Philippe Entremont in 2004 (Tritó)

References

Bibliography

External links 
 
 
  Francis Poulenc L'histoire de Babar, le petit éléphant, melodrama for narrator & piano (or orchestra) on AllMusic
 L'Histoire de Babar with lyrics (French)
 L'histoire de Babar le petit éléphant cartoon on YouTube
 Poulenc: L'histoire de Babar, le petit éléphant (The Story of Babar, the Little Elephant) on Presto classical (list of all interpretations)
 Agathe Mélinand: Histoire de Babar, le petit éléphant lestive.com 2014

Compositions by Francis Poulenc
Compositions for solo piano
1946 compositions
Compositions with a narrator
Songs about elephants
Songs about fictional male characters